Emma Spitz (born 10 April 2000) is a professional golfer from Austria. In 2018 she became the first Austrian to win The R&A's Girls Amateur Championship.

Amateur career
Spitz has had a prolific amateur career. She won the Austrian Stroke Play Championship in 2015, 2016, 2020 and 2021, and was runner up at the event in 2018 and 2019. In 2017 she was runner-up at the German Girls Open and the Austrian International Amateur, which she subsequently won in 2020. She has won the Austrian Match Play three times, and the Italian International Amateur Championship twice. She was runner up at the 2018 Slovenian Amateur Championship, and won the event in 2019.

Spitz played for the National Team starting in 2013 and represented Austria at five European Girls/Ladies Team Championship between 2015 and 2019, and at the Espirito Santo Trophy in 2016 and 2018.

She represented Europe at the Junior Solheim Cup in 2015 and 2017, the Junior Ryder Cup in 2016 and 2018, the Junior Vagliano Trophy in 2015, the Patsy Hankins Trophy in 2016, and the Vagliano Trophy in 2019.

In 2018, Spitz defeated fellow Austrian Isabella Holpfer, 2 and 1, to win the British Girls Amateur Championship at Ardglass, Northern Ireland. She qualified for the 2019 Women's British Open at Woburn Golf Club in England, but missed the cut.

At the 2018 Youth Olympic Games in Argentina, she lost a playoff for the silver medal and had to settle for bronze in the Girls event and a 4th place in the Mixed team event. She finished fourth at the 2020 European Ladies Amateur.

College career
Spitz enrolled at UCLA in 2019 as a psychology major. As a freshman, she was an Annika Award finalist, a WGCA and Golfweek First Team All-American, and led UCLA in scoring average.

She made her U.S. Women's Open debut by virtue of being number 20 in the World Amateur Golf Ranking in 2020 at Champions Golf Club, but missed the cut.

Spitz played in the Arnold Palmer Cup in 2020 and 2021. She finished 3rd at the 2021 Augusta National Women's Amateur and was runner-up one stroke behind Rachel Heck of Stanford at the 2021 NCAA Division I Women's Golf Championships.

Professional career
Waiting until she was in the top five in the World Amateur Golf Ranking to ensure her place at Final Qualifying tournament for the LPGA and LET, Spitz turned professional in August 2022. She made her professional debut at Skaftö Open, where she tied for 10th place. The following week, she led the Åland 100 Ladies Open after the first round together with Ursula Wikström.

Amateur wins
2015 Austrian Stroke Play Championship, Austrian Match Play, Italian International Amateur Championship
2016 Austrian Stroke Play Championship, European Nations Cup - Copa Sotogrande
2017 Austrian Match Play
2018 Girls Amateur Championship, Italian International Ladies Amateur Championship
2019 Slovenian Amateur Championship
2020 Austrian Stroke Play Championship, Austrian Stroke Play U21, Austrian International Amateur, Austrian Match Play, Bruin Wave Invitational
2021 Austrian Stroke Play Championship, NCAA Simpsonville Regional
2022 Chambers Bay Invitational

Source:

Results in LPGA majors
Results not in chronological order

CUT = missed the half-way cut
NT = no tournament
T = tied

Team appearances
Amateur
European Young Masters (representing Austria): 2014
Junior Vagliano Trophy (representing the Continent of Europe): 2015 (winners)
Junior Solheim Cup (representing Europe): 2015, 2017
Junior Ryder Cup (representing Europe): 2016, 2018
Patsy Hankins Trophy (representing Europe): 2016
Espirito Santo Trophy (representing Austria): 2016, 2018
Youth Olympic Games (representing Austria): 2018
European Girls' Team Championship (representing Austria): 2015, 2017
European Ladies' Team Championship (representing Austria): 2016, 2018, 2019, 2022
Vagliano Trophy (representing the Continent of Europe): 2019 (winners)
Arnold Palmer Cup (representing the International team): 2020 (winners), 2021

Source:

References

External links

Austrian female golfers
UCLA Bruins women's golfers
Golfers at the 2018 Summer Youth Olympics
Sportspeople from Vienna
2000 births
Living people